Morning, An Overcast Day, Rouen is a late 19th-century painting by Danish-French artist Camille Pissarro. Done in oil on canvas, the work depicts the industrial cityscape of Rouen, France. The centerpiece of the painting is Boieldieu Bridge, a steel arch bridge which Pissarro painted  from his room in a nearby hotel. The painting is in the collection of the Metropolitan Museum of Art. 

Pissarro had executed other paintings of the Boieldieu Bridge, in differing weather conditions, on a previous visit to Rouen earlier that year (1896).

See also
List of paintings by Camille Pissarro

References

External links

1896 paintings
Paintings by Camille Pissarro
Paintings in the collection of the Metropolitan Museum of Art
Bridges in art
Maritime paintings